This is the list of awards, nominations, recognition, and achievements received by Toni Gonzaga in her career.

Gonzaga, dubbed "Ultimate Multimedia Star" and "Romantic Comedy Queen", has received enormous awards and recognition in the entertainment industry (in television, film, music, and advertising) from local and international award-giving bodies.

As an actress, Gonzaga has been named as Box-Office Queen by the Guillermo Mendoza Memorial Scholarship Foundation Box-Office Entertainment Awards, as well as Best Actress from the FAMAS Awards for her performance in the box-office giant, Starting Over Again. She also won PinakaPASADOng Katuwang na Aktres (Best Supporting Actress) for her performance in blockbuster movie Four Sisters and a Wedding from the Gawad PASADO.

As a television host, she has gained multiple wins from the PMPC Star Awards for TV as Best Female TV Host for various shows and programs. Also, she has been elevated to the Hall of Fame of the Aliw Awards in Best Female Emcee category. She was also cited as the Most Trusted Entertainment/Variety Show Presenter by the Reader's Digest Asia.

As a singer, she won as the Best Female Concert Performer in the Guillermo Mendoza Memorial Scholarship Foundation Box-Office Entertainment Awards. PMPC Star Awards for Music has given her the Album of the Year and Female Pop Artist of the Year awards. Moreover, she has received multiple Gold and a Platinum certifications for her albums from the PARI.

Gonzaga was honored on Eastwood City Walk of Fame in 2013 and was inducted to the Hall of Fame in Most Admired Female TV Personality category of Anak TV Seal Awards.

Awards and nominations

Aliw Awards

|-
|2006|| Herself || Best Female Emcee ||  
|-
|2007|| Herself || Best Female Emcee ||  
|-
|2008|| Catch Me Concert || Best Major Concert (Female) ||  
|-
|2010|| Herself || Best Female Emcee ||  
|-
|2011|| Toni @ 10: The Anniversary Concert || Best Major Concert (Female) ||  
|-
|2013|| Herself || Best Female Emcee ||  
|-
|2014|| Herself || Best Female Emcee || 
|-
| rowspan=2|2015|| Herself || Hall of Fame: Best Female Emcee || 
|-
||Celestine Concert  || Best Major Concert (Female) || 
|-

Anak TV Seal Awards

|-
|2007|| Herself || Most Admired Female TV Personality ||  
|-
|2008|| Herself || Most Admired Female TV Personality ||  
|-
|2009|| Herself || Most Admired Female TV Personality ||  
|-
|2010|| Herself || Most Admired Female TV Personality ||  
|-
|2011|| Herself || Most Admired Female TV Personality ||  
|-
|2012|| Herself || Most Admired Female TV Personality ||  
|-
|2014|| Herself || Most Admired Female TV Personality || 
|-
|2015|| Herself || Hall of Fame: Most Admired Female TV Personality || 
|-

Awit Awards

|-
|2006|| Herself || Best New Female Recording Artist || 
|-
|2007|| We Belong  (from You Complete Me album)  || Best Ballad Recording ||  
|-
|2008|| Catch Me, I'm Falling  (from Falling in Love album)  || Best Ballad Recording ||  
|-
|2010|| Ganyan ang Pasko || Best Christmas Recording ||  
|-
|rowspan=3|2011|| You Make Me Feel  (from All Me album)  || Best R&B Lyricist and Artist ||  
|-
|| All Me  (from All Me album)  || Best Dance Recording || 
|-
|| Ngayong Pasko, Magniningning ang Pilipino  (with Gary Valenciano ft. UST Choir)  || Best Christmas Recording || 
|-
|2014|| Kahit Na || Best Novelty Recording || 
|-
|rowspan=2|2015||rowspan=2|This Love is Like  (from Celestine album)  || Best Dance Recording|| 
|-
|| Best Inspirational/Religious Recording || 
|-

FAMAS Awards

|-
|2014||  for Four Sisters and a Wedding  || Best Actress ||  
|-
|rowspan=2|2015||  for Starting Over Again  || Best Actress ||  
|-
|| Herself || Face of the Night || 
|-
|2016||  for You're My Boss  || Best Actress || 
|-

GMMSF Box-Office Entertainment Awards

|-
|2006|| Herself || Most Promising Female Star ||  
|-
|2007||  for You are the One  || Princess of Philippine Movies ||  
|-
|2010|| Herself || Cathy Valencia Skin of the Night || 
|-
|2011||  for My Amnesia Girl  || Princess of Philippine Movies ||  
|-
|2012|| Herself  for Toni @ 10: The Anniversary Concert  || Female Concert Performer of the Year ||  
|-
|2013||  for This Guy's in Love with U Mare!  || Princess of Philippine Movies ||  
|-
|2014|| Herself  for Kahit Na  || Most Popular Novelty Singer ||  
|-
|2015||  for Starting Over Again  || Box Office Queen || 
|-
|2017|| Herself || Female TV Host of the Year || 
|-
|2019|| Herself || Female TV Host of the Year || 
|-
|2020|| Herself || Female TV Host of the Year || 
|-

Golden Screen Awards

|-
|2005|| Herself  for Entertainment Konek || Outstanding Showbiz-Oriented Program Host ||  
|-
|2007||  for You Are the One  || Best Performance by an Actress in a Leading Role (Musical or Comedy) ||  
|-
|2008||  for You Got Me!  || Best Performance by an Actress in a Leading Role (Musical or Comedy) ||  
|-
|2009||  for My Only Ü  || Best Performance by an Actress in a Leading Role (Musical or Comedy) ||  
|-
|2011||  for My Amnesia Girl  || Best Performance by an Actress in a Leading Role (Musical or Comedy) ||  
|-
|2013|| Herself || Outstanding Female Showbiz Talk Program Host ||  
|-
|rowspan=2|2014|| Herself  for The Buzz || Outstanding Female Showbiz Talk Program Host ||  
|-
|| Herself  for ASAP 18 || Outstanding Female Host in a Musical Program || 
|-

PMPC Star Awards for Movies

|-
|2010|| Herself || Darling of the Press ||  
|-
|2011|| Herself || Female Star of the Night ||  
|-
|2014|| Herself || Female Star of the Night || 
|-
|2015||  for Starting Over Again  || Movie Actress of the Year ||  
|-

PMPC Star Awards for Music

|-
|2009|| Herself || Nesvita Beautiful Inside and Out ||  
|-
|rowspan=5|2011|| Herself || Female Pop Artist of the Year ||  
|-
|| Herself || Female Face of the Night || 
|-
|| All Me || Album of the Year ||  
|-
|| Catch Me, I'm Falling || Song of the Year || 
|-
|| Herself || Female Recording Artist of the Year || 
|-
|rowspan=2|2012|| Herself  for Toni @ 10: The Anniversary Concert  || Female Concert Performer of the Year ||  
|-
|| Greatest Hits || Compilation Album of the Year || 
|-
|rowspan=6|2015|| Celestine || Album of the Year || 
|-
|| Herself || Female Recording Artist of the Year || 
|-
|| Celestine || Pop Album of the Year || 
|-
|| Herself || Female Pop Artist of the Year || 
|-
|| Celestine || Concert of the Year || 
|-
|| Herself  for Celestine Concert || Female Concert Performer of the Year || 
|-
|rowspan=2|2016|| Herself || Female Recording Artist of the Year || 
|-
|| Herself || Female Pop Artist of the Year || 
|-

PMPC Star Awards for Television

|-
|2004||  for Lagot Ka, Isusumbong Kita || Best Comedy Actress ||  
|-
|rowspan=3|2005||  for Lagot Ka, Isusumbong Kita  || Best Comedy Actress ||  
|-
|| Herself || Best Female TV Host || 
|-
|| Herself  for Entertainment Konek  || Best Female Showbiz-Oriented Talk Show Host || 
|-
|rowspan=2|2006|| Herself || Best Female TV Host ||  
|-
||  for Wazzup Wazzup  || Best Comedy Actress  ||  
|-
|rowspan=2|2007||  for Wazzup Wazzup  || Best Comedy Actress ||  
|-
|| Herself || Best Female TV Host  || 
|-
|rowspan=2|2008|| Herself  for Entertainment Live  || Best Female Showbiz-Oriented Talk Show Host ||  
|-
|| Herself || Best Female TV Host  || 
|-
|rowspan=3|2009|| Herself  for Entertainment Live  || Best Female Showbiz-Oriented Talk Show Host ||  
|-
|| Herself || Best Female TV Host  ||  
|-
|| Herself  for Pinoy Dream Academy  || Best Reality Show Host  || 
|-
|rowspan=3|2010|| Herself || Best Female TV Host ||  
|-
|| Herself  for Pinoy Big Brother: Double Up  || Best Reality Show Host  || 
|-
|| Herself  for Entertainment Live  ||  Best Female Showbiz-Oriented Talk Show Host  ||  
|-
|rowspan=3|2011|| Herself || Best Female TV Host ||  
|-
|| Herself || Star of the Night  || 
|-
|| Herself  for The Buzz  ||  Best Female Showbiz-Oriented Talk Show Host  || 
|-
|rowspan=3|2012|| Herself || Best Female TV Host ||  
|-
|| Herself  for The Buzz  ||  Best Female Showbiz-Oriented Talk Show Host  || 
|-
|| Herself  for Pinoy Big Brother: Unlimited  || Best Reality/Game Show Host  || 
|-
|rowspan=3|2013|| Herself  for The Voice of the Philippines  || Best Talent Search Program Host || 
|-
|| Herself || Best Female TV Host || 
|-
|| Herself  for The Buzz  ||  Best Female Showbiz-Oriented Talk Show Host  || 
|-
|rowspan=5|2014||  for Home Sweetie Home  || Best Comedy Actress || 
|-
|| Herself ||  Best Female TV Host  || 
|-
|| Herself  for Pinoy Big Brother: All In  || Best Reality Show Host  || 
|-
|| Herself  for The Voice of the Philippines  || Best Talent Show Program Host || 
|-
|| Herself  for The Buzz  ||  Best Female Showbiz-Oriented Talk Show Host  || 
|-
|rowspan=4|2015||  for Home Sweetie Home  || Best Comedy Actress || 
|-
|| Herself  for The Buzz  ||  Best Female Showbiz-Oriented Talk Show Host  || 
|-
|| Herself  for Pinoy Big Brother: 737  || Best Reality Show Host  || 
|-
|| Herself ||  Best Female TV Host  || 
|-
|rowspan=2|2016||  for Home Sweetie Home  || Best Comedy Actress || 
|-
|| Herself  ||  Best Female TV Host  || 
|-
|rowspan=3|2017||  for Home Sweetie Home  || Best Comedy Actress || 
|-
|| Herself  ||  Best Female TV Host  || 
|-
|| Herself  for The Voice Teens  || Best Talent Search Program Host || 
|-
|rowspan=2|2018||  for Home Sweetie Home  || Best Comedy Actress || 
|-
|| Herself  ||  Best Female TV Host  || 
|-
|rowspan=2|2019||  for Home Sweetie Home  || Best Comedy Actress || 
|-
|| Herself  ||  Best Female TV Host  || 
|-
|2021||  for Home Sweetie Home  || Best Comedy Actress || 
|-

Others

Alta Media Icon Awards

|-
| rowspan=2|2015||  for Home Sweetie Home  || Best Actress for TV (Comedy Role) || 
|-
||Herself  for Pinoy Big Brother  || Best Reality Show Host  || 
|-
|2019||  for Home Sweetie Home  || Best Comedy Actress for Television || 
|-

ASAP 24K Gold Awards

|-
|2007|| Falling in Love album || Female Artist Awardee ||  
|-
|2009|| Love is... Toni Gonzaga album || Female Artist Awardee ||  
|-
|2011|| All Me album || Female Artist Awardee ||  
|-

ASAP Platinum Circle Awards

|-
|rowspan=3|2007|| Falling in Love album || Female Artist Awardee ||  
|-
|| Hotsilog album || Compilation Album Awardee || 
|-
|| Nagmamahal Kapamilya album || Compilation Album Awardee || 
|-

ASAP Pop Viewer's Choice Awards

|-
|rowspan=2|2006||  as  Sally Malasmas  in You are the One (with Sam Milby as Will Derby)  || Pop Screen Kiss || 
|-
|| You are the One || Pop Movie Theme Song || 
|-
|rowspan=2|2007|| You Got Me! || Pop Movie || 
|-
||  as  Amor Santander  in You are the One (with Sam Milby as Kevin Robles)  || Pop Screen Kiss || 
|-

Asia Pacific Luminare Awards

|-
|2022|| Herself || Most Remarkable Talk Show Host of the Year || 
|-

COMGUILD Media Awards

|-
|2015|| Herself || Most Admired Female Endorser || 
|-

CommExcel Students' Choice Awards

|-
|2015|| Herself || Outstanding Female TV Personality || 
|-

Eastwood City Walk of Fame

|-
|2013|| Herself ||  contribution in TV, Music, Film, and Advertising  ||  
|-

EdukCircle Awards

|-
|2014|| Herself || Most Influential Film Actress of the Year || 
|-
|rowspan=3|2015|| Herself || Most Influential Celebrity Endorser of the Year || 
|-
|| Herself || Most Influential Concert Performer of the Year || 
|-
|| Herself || Best Talent Show Host || 
|-
|2016|| Herself || Best Female Variety Show Host || 
|-
|2017|| Herself || Best Female Talent Show Host || 
|-
|2018|| Herself || Best Female Talent Show Host || 
|-
|2019|| Herself || Best Female Reality Show Host || 
|-

FHM Magazine

|-
|2004|| Herself || 100 Sexiest Women in the World || :#84 
|-
|2005|| Herself || 100 Sexiest Women in the World || :#16 
|-
|2006|| Herself || 100 Sexiest Women in the World || :#27 
|-
|2007|| Herself || 100 Sexiest Women in the World || :#33 
|-
|2008|| Herself || 100 Sexiest Women in the World || :#35 
|-
|2009|| Herself || 100 Sexiest Women in the World || :#46 
|-
|2010|| Herself || 100 Sexiest Women in the World || :#40 
|-
|2011|| Herself || 100 Sexiest Women in the World || :#29 
|-
|2012|| Herself || 100 Sexiest Women in the World || :#29 
|-
|2013|| Herself || 100 Sexiest Women in the World || :#53 
|-

FMTM Awards for Movies

|-
|rowspan=2|2010|| rowspan=2|  for My Amnesia Girl  || Blockbuster Queen ||  
|-
|| Blockbuster Movie Artist || 
|-

Gawad Lasallianeta

|-
|2022||  for  Toni Talks || Most Outstanding Talk Show (TV/Online) || 
|-

Gawad PASADO

|-
|2014||  for Four Sisters and a Wedding  || PinakaPASADOng Katuwang na Aktres ||  
|-

Global Trends Business Leaders Awards

|-
|2022|| Herself || Bankable Multifaceted Female TV Host of the Year || 
|-

Golden Laurel: Lycean Choice Media Awards

|-
|2016|| Herself || Best Reality Show Host || 
|-

Himig Handog P-Pop Love Songs

|-
|2013||  Interpreter of  Kahit Na,  composed by Julius James de Belen  || Best Song || :
5th place 
|-

MOR Pinoy Music Awards

|-
|2014|| Kahit Na || Dance Hit of the Year ||  
|-

Municipality of Taytay, Rizal

|-
|2016|| Herself || Most Outstanding Women of Taytay || 
|-

Myx Music Awards

|-
|rowspan=2|2007|| Herself || Favorite Female Artist || 
|-
|| Herself || Favorite New Artist || 
|-
|rowspan=3|2008|| Catch Me, I'm Falling || Favorite Ringtone ||  
|-
|| Herself || Favorite Female Artist || 
|-
|| Catch Me, I'm Falling || Favorite Mellow Video || 
|-
|rowspan=3|2015|| Herself || Favorite MYX Celebrity VJ || 
|-
|| This Love is Like || Favorite Song || 
|-
|| Herself || Favorite Female Artist || 
|-

People Asia Magazine

|-
|2007|| Herself || Women of Style and Substance ||  
|-
|2014|| Herself || Women of Style and Substance ||  
|-

PEP List Awards

|-
|2014|| Herself || Fab Award (Female) || 
|-
|rowspan=2|2016|| Herself || Movie Star of the Year (Female) || 
|-
|| Herself and Paul Soriano || Favorite Wedding of the Year || 
|-

Phoenix Excellence Award for Entertainment

|-
|rowspan=2|2021|| Herself || Best Female Host || 
|-
|| Herself  || Phenomenal Vlogger of the Year || 
|-

Platinum Stallion Media Awards

|-
|2018||  for Last Night  || Best Film Actress || 
|-
|2021|| Herself || Inspiring Social Media Influencer || 
|-

PUSH Awards

|-
|rowspan=2|2015|| Herself || Favorite Female Celebrity || 
|-
|| Herself ||  Most Popular Female Celebrity  || 
|-
|2017|| Herself || Celebrity Host of the Year || 
|-

RAWR Awards (LionhearTV)

|-
|2015|| Herself || Host/Presenter of the Year || 
|-
|2020|| Herself || Favorite TV Host || 
|-
|2021|| Herself || Vlogger of the Year (Long)|| 
|-

Reader's Digest Asia

|-
|2016|| Herself || Most Trusted Entertainment/Variety Show Presenter || 
|-

SM Cinema Awards

|-
|2011||  for My Amnesia Girl  || Box Office Queen ||  
|-

Star Studio Celebrity Style Awards

|-
|rowspan=2|2010|| Herself || Most Stylish Comedienne ||  
|-
|| Herself || Most Stylish Live Performer (Female) ||  
|-

Tatler Asia

|-
|2021|| Herself || Asia's Most Influential ||  
|-

UmalohokJUAN Media Awards

|-
|2016|| Herself || Best Female TV Host || 
|-
|2018|| Herself || Best Female TV Host || 
|-

USTv Awards

|-
|2004|| Herself || Students' Choice of Best Female Program Host ||  
|-
|rowspan=3|2014|| Herself  for The Voice of the Philippines  || Students' Choice of Reality/Game Show Host ||  
|-
|| Herself  for The Buzz  || Students' Choice of Talk Show Host || 
|-
|| Herself  for ASAP  || Students' Choice of Variety Show Host ||  
|-
|rowspan=3|2015|| Herself  for The Buzz  || Students' Choice of Talk Show Host || 
|-
|| Herself  for The Voice of the Philippines (season 2)  || Students' Choice of Reality/Game Show Host || 
|-
|| Herself  for ASAP  || Students' Choice of Variety Show Host || 
|-

Viral Awards

|-
|2022|| Herself || Empowered Icon Influencer of the Year || 
|-

Walk on Water (W.O.W.) Awards: The ABS-CBN Special Recognition

|-
|2007|| <small> for Pinoy Big Brother || W.O.W. Award Team Category || 
|-

Yahoo OMG! Awards

|-
|2011|| Herself || Favorite Female TV Host ||  
|-
|2012|| Herself || Favorite Female TV Host ||  
|-
|2013|| Herself || Favorite Female TV Host || 
|-
|rowspan=2|2014|| Herself || Favorite Female TV Host || 
|-
||  for Starting Over Again  || Actress of the Year || 
|-

Yes! Magazine

|-
|2007|| Herself || 100 Most Beautiful Stars ||  
|-
|2008|| Herself || Top 20 Celebrity Endorsers ||  
|-
|rowspan=2|2009|| Herself  with Alex Gonzaga  || 100 Prettiest - Siblings || 
|-
|| Herself || 50 Most Powerful Celebrities ||  
|-
|2010|| Herself || 100 Most Beautiful Stars  (under The Heroines Category)  ||  
|-
|2011|| Herself || 100 Most Beautiful Stars  (under Hosts Category)  ||  
|-
|2013|| Herself || 100 Most Beautiful Stars  (under Winning Hosts Category)  ||  
|-
|2014|| Herself || 100 Most Beautiful Stars  (under Blockbuster Queens Category)  ||  
|-
|2015|| Herself || 100 Most Beautiful Stars  (under Phenomenal Category)  || 
|-
|2016|| Herself || 100 Most Beautiful Stars  (under A-Listers Category)  || 
|-
|2017|| Herself || 100 Most Beautiful Stars  (under Prized Stars Category)  || 
|-

References

Lists of awards received by Filipino musician
Lists of awards received by Filipino actor